Jackelina Heredia Cuesta (31 December 1988, Turbo, Antioquia) is a Colombian weightlifter. She competed at the 2012 Summer Olympics in the women's 58 kg. She won the gold medal in snatch and clean & jerk during the 2014 Pan American Sports Festival.

References

Living people
Olympic weightlifters of Colombia
Weightlifters at the 2012 Summer Olympics
Colombian female weightlifters
Pan American Games medalists in weightlifting
Pan American Games silver medalists for Colombia
1988 births
Sportspeople from Antioquia Department
South American Games gold medalists for Colombia
South American Games medalists in weightlifting
Weightlifters at the 2011 Pan American Games
Competitors at the 2018 South American Games
Medalists at the 2011 Pan American Games
21st-century Colombian women